Hugo Nys and Tim Pütz were the defending champions but chose not to defend their title.

Quentin Halys and Tristan Lamasine won the title after Denys Molchanov and Sergiy Stakhovsky retired trailing 1–6, 0–2 in the final.

Seeds

Draw

References

External links
 Main draw

Biella Challenger Indoor III - Doubles